Aquatics may refer to:
Aquatic sports in the Olympics and other international competitions, including the disciplines of swimming, diving, synchronized swimming, water polo, and open water swimming
Water-related sports more broadly (including boat racing, water skiing, swimming, etc.); see List of water sports
Water-based techniques or modalities used for aquatic therapy
Golfing term occasionally used to describe a water hazard
Aquatic plants

See also
 Aquatic (disambiguation)